Robert L. Newkirk (born March 6, 1977) is a former American football defensive tackle who played for the New Orleans Saints and Chicago Bears of the National Football League (NFL). He played college football at Michigan State University.

References 

1977 births
Living people
People from Belle Glade, Florida
Players of American football from Florida
American football defensive tackles
Michigan State Spartans football players
Dallas Cowboys players
New Orleans Saints players
Chicago Bears players